MWW may refer to:
 The Mann-Whitney-Wilcoxon test for statistical significance
 Marquis Who's Who, a publisher of directories with short biographies of influential persons
 The White Hmong language (SIL code MWW)
 Milky Way Wishes, a subgame in the video game Kirby Super Star
 Missing white woman, or "Married White Woman"
 Moment magnitude scale for earthquakes
 Monster Worldwide, a website operating company (NYSE ticker symbol MWW)
 .MWW, a file format for Music Works, a music software program
 MWW (company), a public relations firm
 Myanmar Wide Web, a tongue-in-cheek reference to restricted Internet in Burma

See also
 MW2 (disambiguation)